Haft Yaran (also Romanized as Haft Yārān) is a village in Tudeshk Rural District, Kuhpayeh District, Isfahan County, Isfahan Province, Iran. As of the 2006 census, its population was 32, with 8 families.

References 

Populated places in Isfahan County